Penrose Island Marine Provincial Park is a provincial park in the Central Coast region of British Columbia, Canada, located on the north side of the entrance to Rivers Inlet, 86 km north of Port Hardy at the south end of Fitz Hugh Sound.  Comprising 1,079 hectares of marine area and 934 hectares of land area, the park is accessible by boat only and entrance to its anchorages are on its eastern side, the western being exposed to the open ocean.  Exploration by dinghy and kayak are popular with visitors, as are nature viewing, scuba diving and exploring the islands many beaches and adjoining islets.  The nearest supply centre for fuel and food is at the community of Rivers Inlet.

References

BC Parks infopage

Central Coast of British Columbia
Provincial parks of British Columbia
1992 establishments in British Columbia
Protected areas established in 1992
Marine parks of Canada